Chen Yi-wen (born 1966) is a Taiwanese filmmaker and actor.

Career 
While Taiwanese directors are often associated with slower-paced, personal art films, Chen decided early on when he entered the film industry that he wanted to produce high quality, entertainment-oriented movies.

"The performing arts shouldn’t be inhibited by theory." Chen has established a solid foundation with a career that includes screenwriting, directing, as well as theatre, instilling his films with a unique and distinguished style.

Chen's first short film, Scenes of Violence, cost NT$3,000 to produce and earned NT$600,000 in returns from television sales in Taiwan and Japan. This success gave him the confidence to devote himself to the film industry. Chen was even interviewed by Wealth Magazine for an in-depth report on the success of his short film for its high ROI (return on investment).

In 1998, a Japanese corporation invested in Chen's first feature film JAM.  The film set a record of continuously running for over three months in theatres.

After the success of JAM, Chen completed a gangster film, A Chance to Die, once again getting financing from Japan. He asked Miki Mizuno, a well-known Japanese actress, and Takashi Kashiwabara, a famous Japanese idol who is also popular in Taiwan, to play the main characters. This was his second feature film.

For his third feature film, The Cabbie, Chen was able to get Rie Miyazawa, an accomplished Japanese actress, to play the leading role of the movie. The Cabbie was a fresh and inventive take on the Taiwanese comedy.

Chen's creativity and skills are on full display in the work of these three films.  In being vivid and confident in the shooting, drawing on a strong foundation of the visual arts, the dramatics of storytelling, and with a focus on the shaping each characters’ unique inner lives, Chen has always been able to effectively create entertaining and audience-friendly films while still maintaining his a strong vision.

Chen has continued to search for new and innovative storytelling methods. He returned from a short-term sabbatical in New York, with a renewed focus on producing high quality films.

In 2006, Chen finished a 35mm feature film, Tripping, also known as Time Tripper, which combined the road movie with a martial arts film. In 2013, he produced and directed As the Winds Blow.

After 2015, Chen worked as an actor in many feature films, Godspeed, The Great Buddha+, Xiao Mei, High Flash, A Sun, The Falls ... and so on, and he also acted on Netflix programs, Wake Up 2, On Children, and Monstrous Me.

In 2019, Chen got the Best Leading Actor Award by the feature film A Sun in the 56th Golden Horse Awards and he also got the nominee of the Best Leading Actors by a short film A Taxi Driver in the 54th Golden Bell Awards.

The Best Actor Award (Short Film) went to Yi-Wen by a short film Growing Pains in the 40th Hawaii International Film Festival in 2020.

Filmography

Worked as an Actor in Feature Films

Worked as an Director

Feature Films Directed 
1994 A Confucian Confusion（Assistant Director）
1998 Jam（Screenwriter, concurrently）
2000 A Chance to Die（Screenwriter & Costume Designer, concurrently）
2000 The Cabbie
2006 Tripping (aka: Time Tripper, aka: Gen Yu Den)（Screenwriter, concurrently）
2009 File No. 1689（Screenwriter & Producer, concurrently）
2013 As the Winds Blow（Screenwriter & Producer, concurrently）

Short Films Directed 
1994 Scenes of Violence（Screenwriter, concurrently）
1995 Lessons（Screenwriter, concurrently）

Awards and Nominations for Actor or Director

References

External links
 Chen Yi-wen's Facebook 

1966 births
Living people
Taiwanese filmmakers